Maroussia Paré (born 18 July 1996) is a French sprinter. She competed in the 4 × 100 metres relay event at the 2015 World Championships in Athletics in Beijing, China.

References

External links

1996 births
Living people
French female sprinters
World Athletics Championships athletes for France
Sportspeople from Bordeaux